Pabstiella is a small  orchid genus belonging to the subfamily Epidendroideae. They occur in Central and Tropical America.

While the "Checklist of Monocotyledons" of Kew Botanical Gardens (2005)  considers Pabstiella as an accepted name, it is considered a synonym of Pleurothallis by the Vascular plant families and genera (R.K. Brummitt, 1992). The synonym Anthereon Pridgeon & M. W. Chase  is a nom. illeg.  because it includes the type of the earlier accepted name Pabstiella

Species 

Pabstiella aryter  (Luer) F.Barros (synonym Pleurothallis aryter)
Pabstiella determannii  (Luer) F.Barros  (synonym Pleurothallis determannii)
Pabstiella mirabilis  (Schltr.) Brieger & Senghas  (type genus) (synonym Pleurothallis mirabilis)
Pabstiella syringodes  (Luer) F.Barros  (synonym Pleurothallis syringodes)
Pabstiella tripterantha (Rchb.f.) F.Barros (synonym Pleurothallis tripterantha)
Pabstiella yauaperyensis  (Barb. Rodr.) F. Barros  (synonym Lepanthes yauaperyensis)

References

External links 

 
Pleurothallidinae genera